The Phoenix Foundation is a New Zealand indie rock band formed in Wellington in 1997.

History

Early years and China Cove
The band was founded by Conrad Wedde, Samuel Flynn Scott, and Luke Buda in 1994 while students at Wellington High School. In 2001, the band expanded their lineup, and were joined by Tim Hansen (bass), Richie Singleton (drums) and Will Ricketts (percussion). The band took their name from a fictional organization on the popular television show MacGyver. After playing together for several years, they released the China Cove EP in 2000.

Horsepower
Their first full-length album Horsepower was released by Capital Recordings in mid-2003 to critical acclaim, and was moderately successful. Horsepower included such singles as "This Charming Van" and "Let Me Die A Woman", which received extensive airplay on alternative radio stations such as 95bFM and RDU-FM.

Pegasus
In 2004, the band began work on their second album Pegasus, with Warner Emery replacing Hansen on bass. The album was released in early 2005 and met with some commercial success, eventually obtaining gold status in New Zealand. It was released in Australia by Remote Control Records in October 2006.

In 2005, the Phoenix Foundation toured with the Finn Brothers and put on their own theatre tour which included shows at the Wellington Opera House and Auckland's grand St. James Theatre. In June 2005 producer Jet Jaguar released remixes of songs from Horsepower on his website which are available for download.

Luke Buda was the first of the group to release solo material. His EP The C-Sides (2003) met with critical acclaim in local music reviews. This recording features the long time live favourite from the early days of The Phoenix Foundation, "Television Songs".  Both Buda and Samuel Flynn Scott released solo albums in 2006. Buda's Special Surprise came out on Arch Hill Recordings, and showcases his love of synth pop and carefully crafted melody. Scott's record The Hunt Brings Us Life was released on Loop Recordings. It has a more ramshackle feel than the music of The Phoenix Foundation and delves deeper into the Americana that Scott's songs on Pegasus hinted at.

Happy Ending
The band recorded the original score to the Taika Waititi film Eagle vs Shark in early 2006. The film was released world-wide on Miramax at the Sundance Film Festival in 2007. Following this success they also provided the score to Waititi's 2010 film, Boy.

The Phoenix Foundation signed a deal with label Young American Recordings to release their records in the United States. The first American release was Horsepower, on 13 March 2007.

The Phoenix Foundation released Happy Ending, their third album, in New Zealand in September 2007. This release was a switch from the Festival arm of Warner Music Group to Flying Nun, and features the single "Bright Grey".

After the release of Happy Ending, five members of the band released solo projects. In 2008, Scott's Straight Answer Machine was released (under the name Samuel F. Scott and the B.O.P.) and Buda released Vesuvius. In 2009, Conrad Wedde, Will Ricketts and Richie Singleon all released debut solo albums: Wedde's Bronze, Ricketts' (under the name Wild Bill Ricketts) John Dryden and Singleton's (under the name Rebel Peasant) The Walls of the Well. In 2009, Scott and Buda composed the soundtrack for the film Separation City, which featured many Phoenix Foundation tracks.

The Phoenix Foundation played support on the Split Enz tour of 2008.

Buffalo
The Phoenix Foundation released the Merry Kriskmass EP in December 2009. It included songs that, according to the band, wouldn't fit with the atmosphere of their forthcoming album. The band's fourth album, Buffalo, was released in New Zealand on 26 April 2010. For the first time in the band's history, the album was released on vinyl as well as a digital download together with The Do Son EP.

Bass player Warner Emery left the band during the recording of Buffalo on amicable terms. He was replaced by Tom Callwood, who had previously provided double bass on the Merry Kriskmass track 'Forget It', and cello on Happy Ending.

At the end of September 2010, the Phoenix Foundation announced a new record deal with UK record label Memphis Industries, which released Buffalo worldwide on 24 January 2011. To coincide with the release, the band toured the UK and Europe in January and February, and returned for a longer tour from May to July 2011. Buffalo was well received by English critics, with The Guardian giving the album a 5-star rating.

The band performed live on the BBC's ‘'Later... with Jools Holland'‘ on 25 October 2011. It was their UK TV debut. The band played two songs, "Buffalo" and "Flock of Hearts". The album was shortlisted for the 2011 Taite Music Prize.

In the meantime, Will Ricketts worked on his second solo album, West Wind, which was released on 3 October 2011.

Fandango
The Phoenix Foundation's fifth album Fandango – their first double album – was announced at the end of January 2013. It was released on 26 April 2013 in New Zealand and Australia (Universal), and 29 April for the UK and Europe (Memphis Industries) rest of the world. The release of the album was celebrated with a free download of the first single from the album: "The Captain" and UK/Europe Tour announcement in May and June in support of the album release.

Fandango was recorded over 15 months at four studios, partially at Neil Finn's Roundhead Studios, partially at a barn in the depths of the NZ countryside, partially at The Party Room in Dunedin, but mostly at the bands' own HQ, The Car Club in Wellington. The album was then mixed with the assistance of long term associate Lee Prebble at The Surgery.

Two different drummers took part in the recording session of Fandango. In September 2012, The Phoenix Foundation announced that Richie Singleton was leaving the band to focus on his work for the environment. It was an amicable split after 12 years playing with the band. Soon after that, Chris O'Connor joined TPF as their new drummer.

The Phoenix Foundation contributed covers to two tribute compilations. The first song was Fleetwood Mac's "Don't Stop" for MOJO'''s free cover CD Rumours Revisited (Issue No. 230, January 2013) and the second one Tim Hardin's "Don't Make Promises You Can't Keep" for Reason To Believe – The Songs of Tim Hardin. The latter tribute album from Full Time Hobby was released on 28 January 2013 and received very positive reviews. The Independent gave 4 out of 5 stars mentioning The Phoenix Foundation's version of "Don't Make Promises" as one of the highlights of the album and a BBC reviewer said that "Kiwi experimental popsters The Phoenix Foundation call upon sublimely intelligent arranging skills to flesh out Don’t Make Promises." The song is regularly broadcast on BBC 6 Music.

 Give Up Your Dreams 
On 7 August 2015, The Phoenix Foundation released their sixth studio album, Give Up Your Dreams, which was met with wide acclaim from critics. The band embarked on an eight-gig tour around New Zealand in support of the album, The album spawned two new singles, "Mountain" and "Give Up Your Dreams", both of which had music videos made for them.

 Friend Ship 
On 16 October 2020, The Phoenix Foundation released their seventh studio album, Friend Ship. Hollie Fullbrook of Tiny Ruins joins them on two tracks (Decision Dollars and Tranquility), and Nadia Reid guests on Hounds of Hell.

Discography

Studio albums

EPs

Singles

Soundtracks
 Eagle vs Shark (2007)
 Boy (2010)
 Hunt for the Wilderpeople (2016)

Awards
 New Zealand Music Awards 

|-
| rowspan="3" | 2004
| The Phoenix Foundation – Horsepower| Album of the Year
| 
|-
| Lee Prebble – Horsepower (The Phoenix Foundation)
| Best Engineer
| 
|-
| Tana Mitchell – Horsepower (The Phoenix Foundation)
| Best Album Cover
| 
|-
| rowspan="3" | 2005
| The Phoenix Foundation – Pegasus| Album of the Year
| 
|-
| Reuben Sutherland and The Phoenix Foundation – "Hitchcock"
| Best Music Video
| 
|-
| Lee Prebble – Pegasus (The Phoenix Foundation)
| Best Producer
| 
|-
| rowspan="5" | 2008
| The Phoenix Foundation – "Bright Grey"
| Single of the Year
| 
|-
| The Phoenix Foundation – Happy Ending| Best Group
| 
|-
| The Phoenix Foundation – Happy Ending| Best Rock Album
| 
|-
| Lee Prebble – Happy Ending (The Phoenix Foundation)
| Best Producer
| 
|-
| Lee Prebble – Happy Ending (The Phoenix Foundation)
| Best Engineer
| 
|-
| rowspan="8" | 2010
| The Phoenix Foundation – Buffalo| Album of the Year
| 
|-
| The Phoenix Foundation – "Buffalo"
| Single of the Year
| 
|-
| The Phoenix Foundation – Buffalo| Best Group
| 
|-
| The Phoenix Foundation – Buffalo| Best Rock Album
| 
|-
| Nathan Hickey – "Buffalo" (The Phoenix Foundation)
| Best Music Video
| 
|-
| The Phoenix Foundation – Buffalo (The Phoenix Foundation)
| Best Producer
| 
|-
| Lee Prebble – Buffalo (The Phoenix Foundation)
| Best Engineer
| 
|-
| Paul Johnson – Buffalo (The Phoenix Foundation)
| Best Album Cover
| 
|-
| rowspan="5" | 2013
| The Phoenix Foundation –  Fandango| Album of the Year
| 
|-
| The Phoenix Foundation –  Fandango| Best Group
| 
|-
| The Phoenix Foundation –  Fandango| Best Alternative Album
| 
|-
| The Phoenix Foundation/Lee Prebble/Brett Stanton – Fandango| Best Producer
| 
|-
| Brett Stanton/Lee Prebble/The Phoenix Foundation – Fandango| Best Engineer
| 
|-
|}

 bNet NZ Music Awards 

|-
| 2002
| The Phoenix Foundation – "The Drinker"
| Best Unreleased Song
| 
|-
| 2005
| The Phoenix Foundation "Hitchcock"
| Best Unreleased Song
| 
|-
| 2006
| The Phoenix Foundation "Damn the River"
| Best Pop Track
| 
|}

 Handle the Jandal 

|-
| 2004
| Richard Bell – "Gone Fishing" (The Phoenix Foundation)
| Best Cinematography
| 
|}

 Kodak Music Clip Awards 

|-
| 2003
| Richard Bell – "Let Me Die a Woman" (The Phoenix Foundation)
| Knack Award
| 
|-
| 2004
| Richard Bell – "Gone Fishing" (The Phoenix Foundation)
| Knack Award
| 
|}

 Qantas Film & Television Awards 

|-
| 2010
| Lukasz Buda, Samuel Scott and Conrad Wedde – Boy''
| Best Original Music in a Feature Film
| 
|}

References

External links 

 
 AudioCulture profile
 Amplifier's Phoenix Foundation page
 NZ Musician Phoenix Foundation interview
 Eventfinder's Phoenix Foundation page
 Luke Buda – Special Surprise
 

New Zealand indie rock groups
Flying Nun Records artists
Musical groups from Wellington